Emilianów-Zosina  is a village in the administrative district of Gmina Koźminek, within Kalisz County, Greater Poland Voivodeship, in west-central Poland.

During the years from 1975 through 1998, the hamlet was administratively a part of the Kalisz Voivodeship.

References

Villages in Kalisz County